Enterprise is an unincorporated community in Luce Township, Spencer County, in the U.S. state of Indiana.

History
The first store opened in Enterprise in the 1830s, and the community was a landing stop for river boats in the mid-19th century. The town wasn't officially laid out until 1862. A post office was established at Enterprise in 1852, and remained in operation until it was discontinued in 1915.

Geography

References

Unincorporated communities in Spencer County, Indiana
Unincorporated communities in Indiana
1862 establishments in Indiana

Sundown towns in Indiana